Novela TV is a Polish television channel owned by Polcast Television, which broadcasts telenovelas. It was launched on May 14, 2012.

References 
The information in this article is based on that in its Polish equivalent.

Television channels in Poland
Television channels and stations established in 2012